Pokrovskoye is a village in Yarkovsky District, Tyumen Oblast, Russia. It is the birthplace of Grigori Rasputin.

Climate 
Pokrovskoye has a typical southern Siberian humid continental climate (Köppen: Dfb), bordering on a subarctic climate (Köppen: Dfc).

References 

Rural localities in Tyumen Oblast
Tyumensky Uyezd
Yarkovsky District